a thigh strap or thigh band may refer to
 any kind of strap that is worn around the thigh, either as a single item or as part of another piece of clothing, such as a thigh holster 
 a garter, a clothing item used to keep stockings up